Pico da Bandeira, or Bandeira Peak (Portuguese for Flag Peak) is the third highest mountain in Brazil, situated on the border of Espírito Santo and Minas Gerais states. It is the highest point in both states. It was historically considered the highest mountain in Brazil until 1965, when Pico da Neblina and Pico 31 de Março, next to the Venezuelan border, were explored, measured, and both found to be higher. The peak is said to have been so named after Pedro II, Emperor of Brazil, ordered a flag to be flown on top of it.

Pico da Bandeira is also remarkable for being the Brazilian mountain with the greatest topographic isolation: 2,344 km (1,457 miles). This means that at less than that distance, there is no other point on the surface of the Earth at equal or greater elevation. In the Americas, only Aconcagua, Denali, Pico de Orizaba and Mount Whitney are more topographically isolated than Pico da Bandeira, and in the entire world, there are only 20 more isolated mountains.

It is one of the major attractions of Caparaó National Park, accessible from the nearby town of Alto Caparaó. That town and the entrance to the park lie in Minas Gerais, but the summit of Pico da Bandeira lies in Espírito Santo.

The summit is accessible to hikers of most age groups, with only very limited fitness requirements.

References 

Mountains of Brazil
Highest points of Brazilian states